"Cold Fish" is a song by English alternative rock band Queenadreena, released as their lead single from their debut album Taxidermy (2000).

Release
"Cold Fish" was released as a CD single as well as a limited edition 5" picture disc vinyl.

Track listing

Personnel
Musicians
KatieJane Garsidevocals
Crispin Grayguitar
Orson Wajihbass
Billy Freedomdrums

Technical
Ken Thomasproduction, engineering
Headrecording

References

2000 singles
2000 songs
Queenadreena songs
Blanco y Negro Records singles